Ralph Joseph Sazio (July 22, 1922 – September 25, 2008) was a football player, assistant coach, head coach general manager and team president for the Hamilton Tiger-Cats.  He also served as president of the Toronto Argonauts.  He is a member of the Canadian Football Hall of Fame (1998) as a builder.

Sazio was born in Avellino, Italy and played high school football at Columbia High School in Maplewood, New Jersey. He played college football at the College of William and Mary and played for the AAFC's Brooklyn Dodgers in 1948.

Career
Ralph Sazio was a mainstay of the Canadian Football League's Hamilton Tiger-Cats as a player, assistant coach, head coach, general manager and team president.

His major contribution was as the Tiger-cats' head coach from 1963 to 1967, winning three Grey Cup championships during that span. He retired from coaching in 1967 as the most successful Tiger-Cat head coach to date in terms of championships (3) and winning percentage.

He later served as Toronto Argonauts team president from 1981 to 1990.

He was elected to the Canadian Football Hall of Fame in 1998 in the builder category. He died in 2008.

Coaching record
 Overall: 60-24-1 (.712)
 Regular Season: 49-20-1 (.707)
 Playoffs: 11-4 (.733)
 1 Grey Cup defeat (1964)
 3 Grey Cups (1963, 1965, 1967)

References

External links

 

1922 births
2008 deaths
American football offensive linemen
Canadian football offensive linemen
Brooklyn Dodgers (AAFC) players
Columbia High School (New Jersey) alumni
Hamilton Tiger-Cats players
Hamilton Tiger-Cats coaches
Hamilton Tiger-Cats team presidents
Hamilton Tiger-Cats general managers
Toronto Argonauts general managers
Toronto Argonauts team presidents
William & Mary Tribe football players
Canadian Football Hall of Fame inductees
People from Maplewood, New Jersey
Italian players of American football
Italian players of Canadian football
Italian emigrants to Canada